The women's pentathlon event at the 2015 European Athletics Indoor Championships was held at March 6, 2015.

Medalists

Records

Results

60 metres hurdles

High jump

Shot put

Long jump

800 metres

Final standings

References

Combined events at the European Athletics Indoor Championships
2015 European Athletics Indoor Championships
2015 in women's athletics